Anna Westberg (14 September 1946 – 26 October 2005) was a Swedish journalist, novelist and non-fiction writer. She made her literary debut in 1978, with the novel Paradisets döttrar. She co-edited the two-volume Kvinnornas litteraturhistoria from 1981/1983. She was awarded the Dobloug Prize in 1992.

References

Further reading 
 

1946 births
2005 deaths
20th-century Swedish novelists
Swedish non-fiction writers
Swedish women non-fiction writers
Dobloug Prize winners
Swedish women novelists
20th-century Swedish women writers
20th-century non-fiction writers